Tehilla Lichtenstein (1893 – 1973) was a cofounder and leader of Jewish Science, as well as an author. She was born in Jerusalem and immigrated to America when she was eleven years old. Her parents were Hava (Cohen) and Rabbi Chaim Hirschensohn. She earned a B.A. degree in Classics from Hunter College and an M.A. degree in literature from Columbia University.

Lichtenstein originally ran the religious school of the Society of Jewish Science in New York, where she also taught Hebrew and Bible. She became the spiritual leader of the Society of Jewish Science when her husband Morris, who had been its leader, died in 1938. Morris's will had declared that the position should go to one of their sons, or to Tehilla if neither of their sons was willing, which as it turned out they were not. Thus Lichtenstein became the first Jewish American woman with a pulpit (although she never sought or received rabbinic ordination) and the first to serve as the spiritual leader of an ongoing Jewish congregation. On December 4, 1938, Lichtenstein gave her first sermon as the new leader of the Society of Jewish Science. It was entitled “The Power of Thought.”  According to the New York Times, which gave a brief notice to the event, over five hundred people attended this sermon. She continued to preach from the pulpit until 1972. She gave over five hundred sermons in all.

She hosted a weekly radio program in the 1950s which was a combination of practical advice and Jewish Science teachings.

Her papers, known as the Tehilla Lichtenstein Papers, are now held at the American Jewish Archives in Cincinnati, Ohio.

Further reading 
 "Applied Judaism," by Tehilla Lichtenstein (1989)
 "Jewish science in Judaism," by Tehilla Lichtenstein and Morris Lichtenstein (1986)
 "The Life and Thought Of Tehilla Lichtenstein," by Rebecca Alpert
 "What to tell your friends about Jewish Science," by Tehilla Lichtenstein (1951)

References 

1893 births
1973 deaths
American radio personalities
Columbia Graduate School of Arts and Sciences alumni
Hunter College alumni
Jewish movements
Jewish scholars
American Jewish theologians
Women Jewish theologians
20th-century American Jews
Women rabbis and Torah scholars